Ian Sharman, born 30 August 1980, is a British ultramarathon runner, coach, and blogger for iRunFar living in Bend, OR. He currently holds the record for the Grand Slam of Ultrarunning and is the winner of the 2013, 2015, 2016 and 2017 Leadville Trail 100. He holds 9 Guinness Book of World's records for running marathons in costumes in the fastest time.

External links
 Sharmanian - Official web site for Ian Sharman

References

Living people
British ultramarathon runners
1980 births
British male long-distance runners
Male ultramarathon runners